General elections were held in Tanganyika on 30 August 1960, following the agreement of the United Kingdom to establish internal self-government for the territory. The Tanganyika African National Union won 70 of the 71 elected seats, whilst the other went to a TANU member who had stood against the official TANU candidate, and immediately joined TANU faction after being elected.

Results

References

Elections in Tanzania
1960 in Tanganyika
Tanganyika
Tanganyika (territory)
Election and referendum articles with incomplete results